The Roman Catholic Diocese of Camden is a  Roman Catholic diocese of the Latin Church in the U.S. state of New Jersey. It consists of 62 parishes and about 475,000 Catholics in the South Jersey counties of Atlantic, Camden, Cape May, Cumberland, Gloucester, and Salem.

The Bishop of Camden presides from the Cathedral of the Immaculate Conception in Camden, although most major ceremonies are held at Saint Agnes Catholic Church in Blackwood. Some liturgies are held at St. Joseph Pro-Cathedral in Camden.

Bishop Dennis J. Sullivan has been bishop of the diocese since 2013. The oldest parish, founded in 1848, is St. Mary's in Gloucester City.

History

Pope Pius XI erected the Diocese of Camden on December 9, 1937, taking its present territory from the Diocese of Trenton and designating the Church of the Immaculate Conception in Camden as its cathedral.  The new diocese had 75 diocesan priests and 11 priests of religious communities to serve approximately 100,000 Catholics in 49 parishes and 31 missions, plus thirty elementary and five secondary schools.

Following completion of its construction in 1952, St. Joseph Church in Camden was declared to be a pro-cathedral because the Cathedral of the Immaculate Conception was too small for cathedral functions.

On April 2, 2008, Bishop Joseph Anthony Galante announced the closing of roughly half of the parishes in the diocese. This followed a previous announcement of the closing of various Catholic schools. The Diocese of Camden was led by Bishop Galante until his resignation was accepted on Jan. 8, 2013.

Sexual abuse scandal
On February 13, 2019, all of the Catholic Dioceses based in New Jersey released the names of clergy who had been credibly accused of sexually abusing children since 1940. Of the 188 listed, 57 were based in the Diocese of Camden. Cardinal Joseph Tobin, Archbishop of Newark and metropolitan of the Ecclesiastical province that encompasses Diocese of Camden, also acknowledged that the alleged acts of abuse committed by the clergy listed were reported to law enforcement agencies. On February 9, 2020, it was reported that all five Catholic dioceses across the state of New Jersey, which includes the Diocese of Camden, had paid over $11 million to compensate 105 claims of sexual abuse committed by Catholic clergy.  Of these 105 claims, 98 were compensated through settlements. The payments also do not involve 459 other sexual abuse cases in these dioceses which are still not resolved.
On July 31, 2020, the Diocese of Camden suspended future payments to alleged victims of clergy sexual abuse, citing the financial impact stemming from the COVID-19 pandemic. 

On August 20, 2020, four new lawsuits were filed against the Diocese of Camden involving three priests who were alleged to have committed sexual abuse while teaching at high schools run by the Diocese. One accused priest, Rev. Kenneth L. Johnston, had served as principal of Gloucester Catholic and St. James high schools. Two of the four new lawsuits were also filed against Rev. Eldridge Evans, a former teacher at St. James High School. Another lawsuit alleged sexual abuse by the Rev. Gerald P. Clements, who taught at Camden Catholic High School. All three priests are dead. On December 1, 2020, it was revealed that the Diocese of Camden was among more than 230 sex abuse lawsuits filed within a period of one year against New Jersey Catholic Dioceses.

In April 2022, the diocese agreed to pay $87.5 million to settle the abuse claims, one of the largest such settlements involving the Catholic Church in the United States.

Bankruptcy
On October 1, 2020, the Diocese of Camden filed a bankruptcy petition in the United States Bankruptcy Court for the  District of New Jersey. The diocese cited civil liability arising from abuse settlements and difficulties arising from the COVID-19 pandemic as the primary sources of financial distress.

Bishops
The following are lists of bishops and auxiliary bishops of the diocese and their years of service, followed by other priests of this diocese who became bishops:

Bishops of Camden
 Bartholomew J. Eustace (1938-1956)
 Justin J. McCarthy (1957-1959)
 Celestine Damiano (1960-1967), Archbishop (personal title)
 George Henry Guilfoyle (1968-1989)
 James T. McHugh (1989-1998), appointed Coadjutor Bishop and later Bishop of Rockville Centre
 Nicholas Anthony DiMarzio (1999-2003), appointed Bishop of Brooklyn
 Joseph Anthony Galante (2004-2013)
 Dennis Joseph Sullivan (2013–present)

Former auxiliary bishop
 James Louis Schad (1966-1993)

Other priests of the diocese who became bishops
 Miguel Pedro Mundo (1962-1978), appointed Auxiliary Bishop of Jataí and later Bishop of Jataí
 James F. Checchio  (1992-2016), appointed Bishop of Metuchen

Schools

 High schools
Bishop Eustace Preparatory School, Pennsauken Township
Camden Catholic High School, Cherry Hill Township
Gloucester Catholic High School, Gloucester City
Holy Spirit High School, Absecon
Our Lady of Mercy Academy (New Jersey), Newfield
Paul VI High School, Haddonfield
St. Augustine Preparatory School, Richland
Wildwood Catholic Academy, North Wildwood

School mergers and closures 
Sacred Heart School was a Catholic elementary school (grades K-8) located in Mount Ephraim, New Jersey for 50 years, from 1947 to 1997. It was presided over by the Roman Catholic Diocese of Camden before closing in 1997 as the result of low enrollment and a pending merger. Students were transferred to Annunciation BVM School in Bellmawr, New Jersey.

Annunciation School was subsequently closed by the diocese at the end of the following 2007–08 school year and was merged into the St. Francis de Sales elementary school in Barrington on its site as a new school, Our Lady of the Sacred Heart. This merged school lasted only one year. It closed after the 2008–09 school year in the face of further declining enrollment and rising costs.

On April 17, 2020, the Diocese of Camden announced plans to close five of its schools at the end of the 2019–2020 school year, including football powerhouse Saint Joseph High School in Hammonton, Wildwood Catholic High School in Wildwood and three elementary schools. However, Wildwood, along with Cape Trinity Catholic School, were both saved after agreeing to merge.

Ecclesiastical province

See also

Catholicism and American politics
History of Roman Catholicism in the United States
Jubilate Deo Chorale and Orchestra
List of the Catholic cathedrals of the United States
List of the Catholic dioceses of the United States
Plenary Councils of Baltimore
Roman Catholicism in the United States

References

External links

Roman Catholic Diocese of Camden Official Site
Catholic cemeteries, Diocese of Camden
Catholic Charities of Camden
Catholic Star Herald - Official Online Newspaper of the Diocese
Faith in the Future - Schools News and Information Site for the Diocese 
Gathering Gods Gifts - Parish Planning for the Diocese 
Lay Ministry Formation Program - Diocese Education Program 
New Jersey Provincial Directory

 
1937 establishments in New Jersey
Camden, New Jersey
Christian organizations established in 1937
Camden
Camden
Companies that filed for Chapter 11 bankruptcy in 2020